The British Overseas Trade Board was an export promotion agency of the UK Department of Trade and Industry from 1972 to 1988. It was set up in 1972 to replace the British Export Board.

Chairmen
 Lord Thorneycroft 1972-1975
 Sir Frederick Catherwood 1975-1979
 Earl of Limerick 1979-1983
 Earl Jellicoe 1983-1987
 Sir James Cleminson, 1987-1988

References

Defunct executive agencies of the United Kingdom government